In enzymology, a pyridine N-methyltransferase is an enzyme that catalyzes the chemical reaction

S-adenosyl-L-methionine + pyridine  S-adenosyl-L-homocysteine + N-methylpyridinium

Thus, the two substrates of this enzyme are S-adenosyl methionine and pyridine, whereas its two products are S-adenosylhomocysteine and N-methylpyridinium.

This enzyme belongs to the family of transferases, specifically those transferring one-carbon group methyltransferases.  The systematic name of this enzyme class is S-adenosyl-L-methionine:pyridine N-methyltransferase. This enzyme is also called pyridine methyltransferase.

References

 

EC 2.1.1
Enzymes of unknown structure